Harvey Bullock may refer to: 

 Harvey Bullock (writer) (1921–2006), American television and film writer and producer
 Harvey Bullock (character), DC Comics character